Baron Aldeburgh was a title in the Peerage of England created by writ on 8 January 1371.  It fell into abeyance on the death of the 2nd Baron on 30 August 1391.

Barons Aldeburgh (1371)
William de Aldeburgh, 1st Baron Aldeburgh  (died 1387)
William de Aldeburgh, 2nd Baron Aldeburgh (died 1391)

References

1371 establishments in England
Abeyant baronies in the Peerage of England
Noble titles created in 1371